Edolisoma is a genus of birds in the cuckooshrike family Campephagidae that are native to the Central Indo-Pacific region, Australia and New Guinea. These species were previously placed in the genus Coracina. They were moved to the resurrected genus Edolisoma based on the results of a molecular phylogenetic study published in 2010. 

The genus contains the following 22 species:
 Admiralty cicadabird (Edolisoma admiralitatis)
 New Caledonian cuckooshrike (Edolisoma anale)
 Pale cicadabird (Edolisoma ceramense)
 Blackish cuckooshrike (Edolisoma coerulescens)
 Kai cicadabird (Edolisoma dispar)
 Pale-shouldered cicadabird (Edolisoma dohertyi)
 Solomons cuckooshrike (Edolisoma holopolium)
 Black-shouldered cicadabird (Edolisoma incertum)
 Pohnpei cicadabird (Edolisoma insperatum)
 Black cicadabird (Edolisoma melas)
 Black-bibbed cicadabird (Edolisoma mindanense)
 Palau cicadabird (Edolisoma monacha)
 Black-bellied cuckooshrike (Edolisoma montanum)
 Sulawesi cicadabird (Edolisoma morio)
 Yap cicadabird (Edolisoma nesiotis)
 White-winged cuckooshrike (Edolisoma ostentum)
 Halmahera cuckooshrike (Edolisoma parvulum)
 Grey-capped cicadabird (Edolisoma remotum)
 Makira cicadabird (Edolisoma salomonis)
 Grey-headed cuckooshrike (Edolisoma schisticeps)
 Sula cicadabird (Edolisoma sula)
 Common cicadabird (Edolisoma tenuirostre)

References

Further reading

 
Bird genera
Taxa named by Honoré Jacquinot
Taxa named by Jacques Pucheran